Kazımiye can refer to the following villages in Turkey:

 Kazımiye, Dursunbey
 Kazimiye, Hopa